The 2018 Southland Conference men's basketball tournament was the postseason men's basketball tournament that completes 2017–18 season in the Southland Conference. The tournament was held at the Merrell Center in Katy, Texas from March 7–10, 2018.  

Stephen F. Austin won the tournament by defeating Southeastern Louisiana in the championship game. As a result, the Lumberjacks received the conference's automatic bid to the NCAA tournament.

Seeds
Teams were seeded by record within the conference, with a tiebreaker system to seed teams with identical conference records. Only the top eight teams in the conference qualified for the tournament. The top two seeds received double byes into the semifinals in the merit-based format. The No. 3 and No. 4 seeds received single byes to the quarterfinals.

Schedule

Source

Bracket

See also
2018 Southland Conference women's basketball tournament

References

Southland Conference men's basketball tournament
2017–18 Southland Conference men's basketball season
Southland Conference men's basketball
Sports competitions in Katy, Texas
College basketball tournaments in Texas